The Aero-Astra Okhotnik is a Russian single engine, three seat autogyro of pusher, pod and boom configuration.  It has been developed into several variants from 2001 to 2007.

Design and development
The Okhotonik light autogyro first flew around 2002. It has since been developed through four distinct variants, the changes involving different model Subaru piston engines, several types and diameters of rotors, enclosed accommodation and some alterations to the tail.  Most have been three seat models, though two seaters have been made and at least one flight demonstrated the ability of the Okhotnik to lift five people.

The Okhotnik is based on a low beam carrying seats, cabin, engine and tail.  The three seats are arranged with the pilot alone in front and two close placed seats behind.  The engine and rotor pylon are immediately behind the rear seats.  The cabin of the Okhotnik  2M and 3 variants is rounded and largely glazed, with side access doors. A two blade rotor with a gust-correcting vane just below its hub rotates freely above a support pylon, though it can be hydraulically pre-rotated for jump starts.  The Subaru engine drives a five blade propeller of radius 950 mm (37.4 in), its tips passing close to the fuselage beam. Two tall, narrow chord tail surfaces are mounted at the end of this beam, at right angles to it but splaying outwards to form a V-Tail. They are supported at the top by an arched transverse member, itself attached by straight struts to the rotor pylon.  On the Okhotnik 3 the top of a third, vertical and forward leaning tail surface is attached to this arch, its lower end held aft of the other tail surfaces on a strut to the fuselage beam.

Operational history
The Okhotnik 2M appeared at the 2005 Moscow Salon in 2005 and the Okhotnik 3 at the same event in 2007.  The latter gained its Certificate of Airworthiness in October 2007.  Three two- seat Okhotniks were delivered during the winter of 2005-6.

Variants
Okhotnik 1Open seats, 9 kW (13 hp) Subaru EJ-25 engine and Dragon Wings 8.53 m (28 ft) rotor. Later fitted with a Rotary Air Force rotor.  Lifted pilot and three passengers 16 October 2002.
Okhotnik 2Rotary Air Force 9.14 m (30 ft) rotor. First flew 28 March 2003
Okhotnik 2M Okhotnik 2 modified with enclosed seating and Subaru EJ-20 engine option.
Okhotnik 3Subaru EZ-30 engine. Initial trials completed by November 2006. Enclosed seating and engine. Modified tail surfaces.

Specifications (Okhotnik 3)

References

2000s Russian civil aircraft
Single-engined pusher autogyros